CJ7 is a 2008 Hong Kong–Chinese comic science fiction film co-written, co-produced, starring, and directed by Stephen Chow. It was released on January 31, 2008, in Hong Kong. It was also released on March 14, 2008, in the United States.

In August 2007 the film was given the title CJ7, a play on China's successful Shenzhou crewed space missions—Shenzhou 5 and Shenzhou 6. It was previously known by a series of working titles—Alien, Yangtze River VII, Long River 7 and most notably, A Hope.  The title probably refers to the Chinese name of the Yangtze River, which is Changjiang.

CJ7 was filmed in Ningbo, in the Zhejiang province of China.

Plot

Chow Ti is a poor construction worker. He lives in a partially demolished house with his nine-year-old son, Dicky. Ti is eager to save money so he can continue sending his son to private school. Not much is known about Dicky's mother, other than the fact she had died when Dicky was young upon Dicky being questioned by Ms. Yuen, Dicky's teacher, one morning as to where his parents were.

Dicky is often bullied by other children, in particular by a boy named Johnny. Johnny is the son of a rich family and bosses other students around at school. He also has other students as his henchmen. Dicky is also chided by his teachers at school because he is poor and wears shabby clothes. Ti often helps Dicky to obtain things from the junkyard as they are too poor to afford certain items, such as his shoes that are tattered. During P.E class, Dicky is punished for wearing torn up shoes and is to stand away. He is sad as he really enjoys doing sports, hoping to have a pair of better shoes soon. Maggie, a large girl in his class joins him as she did not want to participate in P.E class. She also develops a crush on Dicky.

One day, while at a department store, Dicky begs his father to buy him a popular robotic toy called CJ1. Ti cannot afford it, and the situation ends badly when Ti smacks the stubborn Dicky in front of other customers. Dicky finds comfort in Ms. Yuen who is passing by. That night, Ti visits the junkyard where he often picks up home appliances and clothes for Dicky. He finds a strange green orb left by a space saucer and takes it home, telling Dicky that it is a new toy. He is hesitant at first, but later accepts it. The next day, Dicky brings the orb to school and gets beaten up by the other children only to get injured and scolded by Ti. The following evening, the green orb transforms into a cute and cuddly dog-like alien creature that befriends Dicky. After playing with the alien, he learns that it is capable of restorative powers after it restores a rotten apple that fell to the ground. Dicky is very thrilled and names the alien "CJ7", and then falls asleep dancing in happiness.

That night, Dicky dreams that the alien will help him gain popularity and good grades at school. In his dream, he asks the alien of some tasks. First, CJ7 defeats a fierce stray dog in an alley as requested by Dicky. It also helps him score on his exam (by creating a orange pair of glasses to help him cheat with tiny drones with cameras). During this scene, Johnny swats at the drones and Dicky is temporarily unable to see the answers on his paper. Backup drones fly out and they fly towards Mr. Cao, whose glasses lenses get broken as Johnny and a female classmate both swat at the fly-drones. In P.E class (with dream CJ7 constructing a pair of red boots with special powers), he outdoes his classmates in various sports scenes. Eventually, policemen and teachers including Mr. Cao and Ms. Yuen to try and subdue his superhuman powers. He jumps high into the sky thanks to the springs on his shoes. He then jumps off a flying eagle and sees a big cloud in the shape of CJ7.

Upon waking up, Dicky tries to relive his expectations and demands for CJ7 to carry out the tasks again, but CJ7 is unable to be of help. CJ7 does not understand what Dicky asks of him and defecates on his hand, which Dicky has to deal with during his exam. The class bully jeers at him for holding a stool in his hand and shoves it onto Dicky's face. Later, Dicky expresses his anger towards CJ7 and claims he wants to kill it by forcing it to drown in the toilet bowl. He demands CJ7 to help him fix his sports shoes, but out of stress and fear, it projectile defecates onto Dicky. Then in P.E class, Dicky is being hosed down by the schools' gardeners in front of his class and his P.E teacher. His teacher says he brings great shame to the school for his dirtied uniform as his classmates laugh at him. After school, Dicky lures CJ7 from behind a tree, telling it how much he loves it until it is coaxed out. He uses a bag to entrap CJ7 and catches it. Dicky pulls CJ7 out and angrily tells it how it is a useless space dog and only caused trouble for him at school. He tosses it into the garbage bin but soon after questioning his own behaviour admits his own faults, rushing back to try and recover CJ7 from the bin. Dicky finds that the trash has been emptied by a garage truck to his dismay and tries to chase after the truck to save CJ7 but is already too late. Going home, he is dejected and sad to have lost CJ7. Dicky cheers up and runs to hug CJ7, apologizing and saying how much he misses it after seeing Ti sitting with it.

Ti is in awe as to how "high tech" CJ7 is as a play toy, twisting and pulling it to admire its malleability as Dicky watches in great discomfort, with CJ7 writhing and squealing in pain. Dicky begs his father to stop yanking its body around as he has to return his toy to a classmate, lying that he borrowed it. Later in that same night, as Ti and Dicky are asleep, CJ7 wakes up from the cooking pan it was resting in to repair the electric fan that Ti bought, fixing and turning the fan on with its special antenna. It is exhausted and uses up its energy as the ball inside the antenna becomes red. The next morning, Dicky goes to school with CJ7 in his backpack.

When a group of students see the alien with Dicky they forcibly take it and try to cut it with tools but nothing seems to work. At last they try to use a drill and Dicky jumps on them. CJ7 scurries into some nearby bushes. Dicky tries to hit one of the students but a fat boy stops him who in turn is stopped by Maggie. They are all punished for fighting and demanded to explain the situation. When the teacher, Mr. Cao, leaves, CJ7 comes out from hiding and Dicky gets it to perform tricks for the other students and they are awed. Dicky thanks Johnny for not letting Mr. Cao know about CJ7. They shake hands and agree to not let the adults know about it and buy the group one.

At the construction site, Ti randomly shows everyone Dicky's test paper in which he scored 100 until his boss tells him that Dicky changed the marks from 0 to 100 and is a cheater. Then Ti threatens his boss that if he continues saying his son cheated he will hit him. This results in a fight that leads to Ti running off while his boss shouts after him that he is fired. Ti meets Dicky at home and gets angry with him for lying. He takes CJ7 from him and shoves it into his messenger bag, saying he does not get to play with CJ7 since he does not work hard so this upsets Dicky. When Dicky tells Ti to leave him alone, he promises he will if Dicky can score more than 60 on his own.

The following day, Ti comes to Dicky's school to give him his lunchbox. There he meets Ms. Yuen, who offers to help Dicky study. He shakes her hand gratefully and leaves on his bike as Ms. Yuen watches on before leaving. Ti goes back to his boss and apologizes; his boss apologises for calling his son a cheater in front of the other workers. He gives him his job back and his salary as well as a bonus (inside a red packet) so that Ti may buy Dicky new textbooks. Ti remarks of his great luck to the woman operating the lift on his way up to the building he is working on but is shut off with her sliding door. During work, an accident happens with Ti knocking some canisters over, trapping Ti's legs with ropes and pulling him close to the edge. Ti attempts to grab onto a bamboo pole for dear life and a worker asks where his safety harness is. Ti is unable to retrieve it and in doing so loses grip on the bamboo, falls down further to grip some mesh netting, suspended by the canister's weight. Another worker in a lower floor sees him and tries to help by telling Ti to stretch his free hand out along with other workers. Unfortunately, Ti cannot reach his hand and the netting tears apart. Ti falls to his death from the building's scaffolding.

Back at school, Ms. Yuen calls Dicky from his classroom just as he gets his test result in which he scores 65. Dicky is seen sitting at the hospital, clutching onto his paper as he looks on the scene between the doctor, Ti's boss and Ms. Yuen in the door window near him. She goes home with Dicky and tearfully breaks the news to him that his father has passed away. Dicky begins to cry; telling her to leave and pushes her out and locks the house door to sob. In his bawling state, Dicky says that Ti will come back tomorrow and apologises to Ms. Yuen, telling her he is going to sleep as she listens on outside, sliding down to a sitting position as she cries with him out of sympathy.

CJ7, still in the messenger bag which is now under the table on which Ti's dead body is lying, wriggles out of the bag and uses its repairing powers on Ti's body, even though it knows it will take its full power and it will die.

The next morning Dicky finds Ti sleeping next to him. Ti awakes and questions why he is still in his uniform. Dicky rushes to embrace his father and sobs that he will be a good son, repeating Ti's words on not cheating, lying and stealing and to do well at school. They share a loving moment. Then, CJ7 crawls out exhaustedly out of Ti's messenger bag and lies on the bed, powerless and drained from using all its energy on Ti's rejuvenation from the night before. The ball inside his antenna falls and disintegrates, and he transforms into a small doll with cross eyes. They try many ways (using batteries, electric shock and injecting glucose) to get CJ7 back but are unsuccessful.

In the end, it is shown that everything is back to normal. A scene in a park unfolds; the fat boy is in love with Maggie who is in love with Dicky who is in love with another girl who is taken by the bully, Johnny. Ti is in love with Ms. Yuen but is "not funny enough" for her. Dicky wears the alien doll as a neck pendant all the time, hoping that it to come back to life when he closes his eyes, counting to three and opens them. He hears a whimpering sound, only to find a small white dog to be the source of the sound. The dog is quickly lifted away by a classmate. Dicky is sad that CJ7 is still not alive.

In the end, Dicky sees a UFO descending onto the bridge in front of him. Many other alien dogs like CJ7 of various colors and patterns emerge, running towards him and he realizes that the CJ7s are headed by his very own toy.

Cast

 Stephen Chow as Chow Ti
 Xu Jiao as Dicky Chow
 Zhang Yuqi as Ms. Yuen
 Lam Chi-chung as The Boss
 Lee Sheung Ching as Mr. Cao
 Lei Huang as Johnny
 Min Hun Fung as P.E. Teacher

Production
As with the title CJ7, the earlier working titles, A Hope, Yangtze River VII, and Long River 7, referred to the Chinese crewed space program. The mission of Shenzhou 6 was completed in 2006 and the real Shenzhou 7 successfully launched in September 2008. The film had a budget of US$20 million, and heavily uses CG effects. Xu Jiao, the child who plays Dicky, is in fact female. She had to cross-dress to be in the film.

Music tracks featured in CJ7 include "Masterpiece" and "I Like Chopin" by Gazebo and "Sunny" by Boney M.

Homages
References to Chow's other films are made during some scenes, particularly during Dicky's dream sequence. These references include Dicky using his super sneakers to kick a soccer ball into the goal, which subsequently collapses (referencing Shaolin Soccer) and Dicky flying into the sky with his sneakers, jumping from the head of an eagle, seeing CJ7's shape as a cloud and using the Buddha's Palm, (referencing Kung Fu Hustle). The scene where Dicky tosses away his glasses while they self-destruct is a reference to John Woo's Mission: Impossible 2. On one of the DVD featurettes, Chow cites E.T. the Extra-Terrestrial and Doraemon as an influence on the film.

Critical reception
During its North American limited release, CJ7 received mixed reviews from critics. The review aggregator Rotten Tomatoes reported that 49% of critics gave the film positive reviews based on 81 reviews, with an average rating of 5.3/10. The site's critics consensus reads, "Eccentric and sweet, Stephen Chow's latest is charming, but too strangely and slackly plotted to work as a whole." The percentage is much lower than Stephen Chow's previous films Shaolin Soccer (90%) and Kung Fu Hustle (90%). Metacritic reported the film has a weighted average score of 46 out of 100 based on 18 reviews, indicating "mixed or average reviews".

The film fared no better with local Hong Kong critics. Perry Lam of Muse gave a decidedly negative review of the film: 'We go to see a Stephen Chow movie for its great entertainment value and, occasionally, its terrific cinematic panache. We don't need to be told that we are morally superior because we don't have much money.'

Awards and nominations

References

External links
 Official Sony Pictures international site
 
 
 
 
 
 Twitchfilm.net – A Hope
 CJ7 Review, Poster and Trailer

2008 films
2000s science fiction comedy-drama films

Chinese science fiction comedy films
Chinese comedy-drama films
Hong Kong science fiction films 
2000s Cantonese-language films
2000s Mandarin-language films
Films directed by Stephen Chow
Films about father–son relationships
Columbia Pictures films 
Sony Pictures Classics films
Chinese New Year films
2008 science fiction films
2000s Hong Kong films